{{Infobox organization
| name                = People For the American Way
| logo                = People For the American Way logo 2007.png
| type                = Advocacy group
| founded_date        = 
| founder             = Norman Lear
| location            = Washington, D.C.
| area_served         = United States
| focus               = Progressive/liberal advocacy
| method              = Media attention, direct-appeal campaigns
| tax_id              = 52-1366721
| status              = 501(c)(4) social welfare organization
| employees           = 61
| employees_year      = 2014
| revenue             = $5,768,692
| revenue_year        = 2014
| expenses            = $5,690,909
| expenses_year       = 2014
| leader_name         = Lara Bergthold
| leader_title        = Chair
| leader_name2        = Michael Keegan<ref name= staff>"Staff ". People for the American Way. Accessed on May 7, 2016.</ref>
| leader_title3       = President
| leader_name3        = Svante Myrick
| affiliations        = 
| website             = 
}}
People For the American Way, or PFAW, is a progressive advocacy group in the United States. Organized as a 501(c)(4) non-profit organization, PFAW was registered in 1981 by the television producer Norman Lear, a self-described "liberal" who founded the organization in 1980 to challenge the Christian right agenda of the Moral Majority.

History
PFAW was founded by the television producer Norman Lear in opposition to the publicized agenda of the Moral Majority, a prominent and influential American political organization associated with the Christian right. Officially incorporated on September 4, 1980, its co-founders included Democratic Congresswoman, Barbara Jordan, and Time Inc. chairman and CEO, Andrew Heiskell. PFAW began as a project of the Tides Foundation, a donor-advised fund that directs money to politically liberal causes.

Former presidents of PFAW include Arthur Kropp, Tony Podesta and Ralph Neas.

Soon after its founding, PFAW launched an affiliated 501(c)(3) organization, People for the American Way Foundation, for the purpose of conducting more extensive educational and research activities for liberal causes. Later, the People for the American Way Voters Alliance was launched as a political action committee.

Activities
PFAW has been active in battles over judicial nominations, opposing U.S. Supreme Court nominees Robert Bork and Brett Kavanaugh and supporting the nomination of Sonia Sotomayor. PFAW is also active in federal elections, donating $339,874 to oppose Republican candidates in the 2014 election cycle, and $351,075 to oppose Republican candidates in the 2016 election cycle.

 Right Wing Watch 
PFAW's Right Wing Watch project is a website that catalogs statements of public figures whom they label as right-wing, including politicians, preachers, and others, with a focus on hate speech and right-wing conspiracy theories. The web site was founded in 2007, expanding on PFAW's earlier practice of VHS recording clips from television programs such as Pat Robertson's 700 Club, for distribution to news media. In 2013, evangelist and politician Gordon Klingenschmitt sent DMCA takedown notices to YouTube against Right Wing Watch's channel, based on copyright claims. The Electronic Frontier Foundation provided legal counsel to Right Wing Watch to defend their channel and posts against YouTube's actions.

In 2014, HGTV withdrew from plans to produce a television series with Jason and David Benham after Right Wing Watch made an issue of their statements about homosexuality.

In 2018, Salon.com and the Daily Telegraph credited Jared Holt, a Right Wing Watch researcher, for causing the removal of Alex Jones's InfoWars program from multiple content distribution sites, including Apple, Inc, YouTube, Facebook, and Spotify. Afterwards, Holt said he received death threats.

In June 2021, Right Wing Watch's YouTube channel, which had been operating for about 10 years, was temporarily suspended by YouTube, who said that the suspension had been an accident. At the time, the channel had about 47,000 subscribers.Right Wing Watch has been quoted by NPR, Fortune, The Daily Beast, HuffPost'', and a local Fox News affiliate.

Leadership
Michael Keegan served as the organization's president for 11 years, through June 2020. On June 15, 2020, Ben Jealous succeeded Keegan as president, and Svante Myrick succeeded Keegan as president on November 14, 2022. Svante Myrick abruptly resigned as mayor of Ithaca, New York, to take that position. Past and present members of the group's board of directors include John Hall Buchanan, Jr., Alec Baldwin, Seth MacFarlane, Mary Frances Berry, Julian Bond, Bertis Downs IV, James Hormel, Dolores Huerta, Jane Lynch, Josh Sapan, Dennis Van Roekel, Howie Klein and Reg Weaver.

Funding
Major donors to PFAW include George Soros' Open Society Institute, the Miriam G. and Ira D. Wallach Foundation, the Bauman Family Foundation, and the Evelyn and Walter Haas Jr. Fund.

References

External links
 
 PFAW YouTube channel

501(c)(4) nonprofit organizations
Church–state separation advocacy organizations
Civil liberties advocacy groups in the United States
Government watchdog groups in the United States
Immigration political advocacy groups in the United States
LGBT political advocacy groups in the United States
Legal advocacy organizations in the United States
Non-profit organizations based in Washington, D.C.
Organizations established in 1980
 
Political advocacy groups in the United States
Separation of church and state in the United States
Progressive organizations in the United States
1980 establishments in the United States